William P. Dimitrouleas (born March 28, 1951) is a United States district judge of the United States District Court for the Southern District of Florida.

Education and career

Born in Lynn, Massachusetts, Dimitrouleas received a Bachelor of Arts degree from Furman University in 1973 and a Juris Doctor from the Fredric G. Levin College of Law at the University of Florida in 1975. He was an assistant public defender for the 17th Judicial Circuit of Florida 1976 to 1977, and then an assistant state attorney of the same circuit from 1977 to 1989. He was a circuit court judge of the 17th Judicial Circuit Court from 1989 to 1998.

Federal judicial service

On January 27, 1998, Dimitrouleas was nominated by President Bill Clinton to a seat on the United States District Court for the Southern District of Florida vacated by Norman Charles Roettger Jr. Dimitrouleas was confirmed by the United States Senate on May 14, 1998, and received his commission on May 22, 1998.

References

Sources

1951 births
Living people
Furman University alumni
Judges of the United States District Court for the Southern District of Florida
United States district court judges appointed by Bill Clinton
Public defenders
People from Lynn, Massachusetts
State attorneys
20th-century American judges
21st-century American judges
Fredric G. Levin College of Law alumni